People and fictional characters with the name Temple include:

Surname
 Bill Temple (footballer) (1914–2006), English footballer
 Derek Temple (born 1938), English footballer
 Diana Temple (1925–2006), Australian pharmacologist
 Floyd Temple (1926–2012), American baseball player and coach
 Francisco P. Temple (1822–1880), Californian statesman and merchant 
 Frédéric Jacques Temple (born 1921), French poet and writer
 Frederick Temple (1821–1902), Archbishop of Canterbury
 George Frederick James Temple (1901-1992), English mathematician
 Henry John Temple, 3rd Viscount Palmerston (1784–1865), British prime minister
 Henry Wilson Temple (1864–1955), American politician
 James Temple (1606–1680), English Civil War soldier and regicide
 Julien Temple (born 1953), English film director
 Juno Temple (born 1989), English actress, daughter of Julien
 Lew Temple (born 1967), American film actor
 Luke Temple, American singer-songwriter
 Nancy Temple, former in-house attorney at Arthur Andersen LLP involved in the Enron scandal
 Nina Temple (born 1956), British communist politician
 Owen Temple (born 1976), American musician
 Peter Temple (1946–2018), Australian crime fiction writer
 Peter Temple (regicide) (1599–1663), English Member of Parliament
 Sir Peter Temple, 2nd Baronet (1592–1653), English Member of Parliament
 Philip Temple (born 1939), New Zealand fiction and non-fiction writer
 Richard Carnac Temple (1850–1931), British Chief Commissioner of the Andaman and Nicobar Islands and anthropological writer
 Robert K. G. Temple (born 1945), American author
 Shirley Temple (1928–2014), American child actress, singer, dancer and ambassador
 Simon Temple, the Elder (1780–1805) and Simon Temple, the Younger (1759–1815), English ship builders at Temple shipbuilders
 Tony Temple (born 1985), American football player
 Tracey Temple, former secretary to and lover of British Deputy Prime Minister John Prescott
 William Temple (governor) (1814–1863), Governor of Delaware
 William Temple (bishop) (1881–1944), Archbishop of Canterbury

Given name
Temple Grandin (born 1947), American professor, slaughterhouse designer and autism activist
Temple Hardy (1765–1814), British Royal Navy officer; grandson of Temple Stanyan
Temple Lea Houston (1860-1905), youngest son of Sam Houston 
Temple F. Smith (born 1939), American professor of biomedical engineering
Temple Stanyan (1675–1752), English politician and historian of ancient Greece
Temple Tucker, American basketball player

Fictional characters
 the title character of Charlotte Temple, a 1791 novel by Susanna Rowson
 Claire Temple, a Marvel Comics character
 Claire Temple (Marvel Cinematic Universe), the 21st-century film version of said character
 the title character of Lucy Temple, Charlotte Temple's daughter in an 1828 novel by Rowson 
 Paul Temple, an amateur private detective created by Francis Durbridge
 Temple Drake, a William Faulkner character